Hasima is a ghost town in Brazoria County, Texas, United States. It is located within the Greater Houston metropolitan area.

History
Hasima was a station on the St. Louis, Brownsville and Mexico Railway, which was built through the area circa 1905. Its name was reportedly used from the first two letters of the townsite contractor's sons; Harry, Simon, and Marion. Even though Hasima never developed fully as a town, it grew around Hasima road. A post office was established at Hasima in 1908. Its population was reported to be 200 in 1913, but it plunged to 75 that next year with six businesses, two livestock breeders, a general store, and companies for real estate, loans, investment, and insurance. Only two homes remained in the 1950s and the railroad station closed. It disappeared from county highway maps in the 1980s.

Geography

Education
In 1917, a local resident taught classes in her home, but a one-room school building was built that next year on a McDonald and Company land grant. The teacher continued to teach students in seven grade levels in 1937, but the school closed two years later. The remaining students went to school in Bay City and Van Vleck. Today, Hasima is located within the Sweeny Independent School District.

References

Ghost towns in Texas